Zuhal is a given name. Notable people with the name include:

 Zuhal Demir (born 1980), Belgian lawyer and politician
 Zuhal Olcay (born 1957), Turkish actress
 Zuhal Sultan (born 1991), Iraqi pianist    
                                          

Arabic feminine given names
Turkish feminine given names